Brian James (born Brian Robertson, 18 February 1955) is an English punk rock guitarist, who is best known for being a founding member of The Damned as well as of The Lords of the New Church.

Biography 
He began his musical career playing in several proto-punk bands including London SS and The Subterraneans, in addition to glam rock band Bastard. James moved on to The Damned, writing almost all the material on their first two albums (Damned Damned Damned and Music for Pleasure) before leaving at the end of 1977. 

In the following years James formed the short-lived Tanz Der Youth together with Andy Colqhoun on bass, Alan Powell on drums and Tony Moore on keyboards. They toured with Black Sabbath and released the single "I'm Sorry, I'm Sorry" / "Delay" in 1978. James then played in Iggy Pop's solo touring band (1979) and recorded his first two solo singles, "Ain't That a Shame" (1979) and "Why? Why? Why?" (1982), both with Stewart Copeland on drums. He also guested on The Saints' 1982 album, Out in the Jungle.

He would later co-found and play in The Lords of the New Church with Stiv Bators. The band recorded three studio albums and one EP, along with several live albums, from 1982 until their break-up in 1989.

James reunited with The Damned for two shows at London Town and Country Club UK June 1988.

Over a decade after his first solo single, he used the time without a band to record his eponymous solo debut album for the New Rose label in 1990. It featured long-time collaborators Malcolm Mortimore on drums and Alan Lee Shaw on bass.

From 1992 to 1996, James then played guitar with the Brussels-based band the Dripping Lips. In 1992 he was invited by Scottish vocalist Robbie Kelman to co-write the soundtrack for the film Abracadabra, directed by Harry Cleven. The subsequent soundtrack album, produced by Kelman, was released in Benelux by EMI/INDISC. The band was composed by Robbie Kelman on vocals, James on guitar, Alan Lee Shaw on bass and Paul Zahl (ex-Flamin' Groovies) on drums. Kelman brought in his friend and record producer Jimmy Miller to helm their second album, Ready to Crack. Shaw had moved on to play guitar in The Damned, and Nico Mansy replaced him on bass.

In 2001 James  recorded the album Mad for the Racket with Wayne Kramer (guitar), Duff McKagan (bass), Stewart Copeland and Clem Burke (drums) as Racketeers. Following that, James, together with Dave Tregunna, reformed The Lords of the New Church in 2002–2003 with vocalist Adam Becvare. The lineup recorded the ten-song unreleased CD Hang On and toured Europe in spring of that year.

When this incarnation of the Lords was over and done, Brian formed another solo outfit: The Brian James Gang. With Brian James on vocals and guitar, the remaining rhythm section of Dave Tregunna (bass) and Steve Murray (drums), the band was completed by Austen Gayton as additional guitarist. Within a year they released the Single New Rose 2006 and a self-titled full length album.

In 2012 he released a solo acoustic album Chateau Brian with former Lords of the New Church touring keyboard player Mark Taylor. In 2013 he revisited the material he played in his Damned years, both live by performing throughout the UK with Damned bandmate Rat Scabies and by re-recording nine Damned songs for his third solo album, Damned If I Do. 2015 saw the release of a new studio album, The Guitar That Dripped Blood, which featured guest appearances from Cheetah Chrome and Adam Becvare.

October 2022 saw James reunite with Scabies, Sensible and Vanian for five Damned Shows in the UK.

Discography

With The Damned
 Damned Damned Damned (1977), Stiff
 Music for Pleasure (1977), Stiff

With Tanz Der Youth
 "I'm Sorry, I'm Sorry" (Single, 1978),  Radar

With The Lords of the New Church
 The Lords of the New Church (1982), (Illegal, I.R.S.)
 Is Nothing Sacred? (1983), I.R.S.
 The Method to Our Madness (1984), I.R.S.
 Hang On (2003), Not on label

With The Dripping Lips
Abracadabra (Original Motion Picture Soundtrack) (1993), Indisc
Ready to Crack? (1998), Alive Records

With The Racketeers
Mad for the Racket (2000), Track Records

Solo

Albums
Brian James (1990), New Rose Records
The Brian James Gang (2006), Easy Action
Chateau Brian (2012), Devils Jukebox Records 
Damned If I Do (2013), Easy Action
The Guitar That Dripped Blood (2015), Easy Action

Singles
"Ain't That a Shame" (1979), BJ Records
"Why? Why? Why?" (1982), Illegal
"New Rose 2001" (2001), Boss Tuneage, Fuxony Records (with Flatpig)
"New Rose 2006" (2006), Easy Action
"Walkin' Round Naked" (2015), Easy Action
"Too Hot to Pop" (2017), Easy Action

Extended Plays
"Anniversary Waltz EP" (2016), Easy Action

References

External links
[ Brian James @ allmusic.com]

English rock guitarists
The Damned (band) members
Living people
1955 births
People from Hammersmith
The Lords of the New Church members